Sighnag or Sghnakh is a village in the Khojaly District of Azerbaijan, in the disputed region of Nagorno-Karabakh. The village had an ethnic Armenian-majority population prior to the 2020 Nagorno-Karabakh war, and also had an Armenian majority in 1989.

History 
During the Soviet period, the village was a part of the Askeran District of the Nagorno-Karabakh Autonomous Oblast. After the First Nagorno-Karabakh War, the village was administrated as part of the Askeran Province of the breakaway Republic of Artsakh. The village was captured by Azerbaijan on 9 November 2020 during the 2020 Nagorno-Karabakh war.

In early July 2021, satellite images released by Caucasus Heritage Watch, a watchdog group made up of researchers from Purdue and Cornell, revealed that an Armenian cemetery dating back to the eighteenth century was bulldozed in order to make way for a new road. This makes it the "second historic cemetery destroyed along the new Fuzuli-Shusha road, after Mets T’agher/Böyük Tağlar."

Historical heritage sites 
Historical heritage sites in and around the village include the 19th-century church of Surb Astvatsatsin, a 19th-century cemetery, and a spring monument built in 1949.

Demographics 
The village had 251 inhabitants in 2005, and 292 inhabitants in 2015.

References

External links 
 

Populated places in Khojaly District
Populated places in Askeran Province